Carl Chun (1 October 1852 – 11 April 1914) was a German marine biologist.

Chun was born in Höchst, today a part of Frankfurt, and studied zoology at the University of Leipzig, where from 1878 to 1883 he was privat-docent of zoology and an assistant to Rudolf Leuckart. After professorial posts in Königsberg (1883–1891) and Breslau (1891–1898), he returned to Leipzig as a professor of zoology.

In 1888, Chun described  seasonal vertical migration (SVM) which has a periodicity of ca. 1 year. Chun examined depth-stratified net samples from the Mediterranean Sea. He explained the seasonal disappearance of jellyfish and crustaceans from the upper pelagial layer of the ocean in terms of their migration to depths below 1000 m. In contrast to diel vertical migration (DVM) which occurs daily, SVM is still not well understood.

He initiated and led the German deep sea expedition (1898/99 "Valdivia" Expedition), which set out on 31 July 1898 from Hamburg to explore the deep sea in the subantarctic seas. They visited Bouvetøya, the Kerguelen Islands, and other islands, before returning to Hamburg, where they arrived on 1 May 1899.

Chun was a specialist on cephalopods and plankton. He discovered and named the vampire squid (Vampyroteuthis infernalis, which means "vampire squid from hell"). Chun was also interested in making science accessible to larger audiences. He published in a popular style a narrative of the "Valdivia" expedition,  which found a wide resonance (Aus den Tiefen des Weltmeeres, 1900).

He died on 11 April 1914 in Leipzig, Germany, aged 61.

Selected works 
 Aus den Tiefen des Weltmeeres, Jena 1900.
 Allgemeine Biologie, Leipzig 1915.
 Die Cephalopoden, 2 volumes., Jena 1910.

See also
 European and American voyages of scientific exploration

Taxon described by him
See :Category:Taxa named by Carl Chun

References

Further reading
Ilse Jahn, ed., Geschichte der Biologie: Theorien, Methoden, Institutionen, Kurzbiographien. 3. ed., Berlin: Spektrum, 2000, pp. 798, 867, 881, 900, 996.

1852 births
1914 deaths
19th-century German biologists
20th-century German biologists
German malacologists
German marine biologists
Teuthologists
Scientists from Frankfurt
Academic staff of Leipzig University
Academic staff of the University of Königsberg
Academic staff of the University of Breslau